This list contains an overview of the mines in the Harz Mountains of central Germany, formerly one of the most productive mining regions in the world.

Bad Grund 
 Grund Ore Mine

Bad Harzburg 
 Hansa Iron Ore Mine Pit, Göttingerode
 Friederike Iron Ore Mine Pit

Bad Lauterberg 
 Wolkenhügel Pit, Bad Lauterberg (closed 2007)

Hahnenklee

Hahnenklee Field 
 August Gallery
 Aufcontainingtigkeit Pit, 1741 - 1761, 42 m depth, probably silver ore
  Pit Beständigkeit Pit, 1739 - 1816 (1828), 90 m depth, silver-containing galena
 Herzogin Philipina Charlotte Pit, 1745 - 1802, probably silver-containing galena
 Johann Georg Pit, 1748 - 1754, probably silver-containing galena
 Morgenröte Pit, 1679 - 1684, probably silver ore
 St. Edmund Pit (upper and lower), 1620 - 1739 (1828), 70 m depth, probably silver ore
  Pit Theodora, ab 1816 Theodora and Beständigkeit, 1741 - 1828, 90 m depth, silver-containing galena
 Lautenthaler Hoffnungsstollen, built 1745 - 1799, length 4 km, 158 m deep in the Theodora Shaft, today a drinking water reservoir

Bockswiese Field 
 Alter Gesellschafter Shaft
 Alter Treibschacht
 Christiane Sophie, a pinge
 Erbtiefster Shaft
  Brauner Hirsch Pit , 1690 - 1755, 70 m depth, silver and copper ores
  Grüne Linde Pit , 1693 - 1724, probably silver ore
 Grüne Tanne and Kahlebergsglück Pit 
 Elisabeth Julians Pit 
 Haus Hannover Pit , 1718 - 1721, probably silver ore
 Haus Wolfenbüttel Pit , 1718 - 1760, 60 m depth, probably silver ore
 Hermann Pit , 1681 - 1696, probably silver ore
 Herzog Anton Ulcontaining Pit , 1673 - 1807, 210 m depth, silver-containing galena
 Herzog August Wilhelm Pit , 1672 - 1738, probably silver ore
 Herzog August Pit, 1663 - 1681 (1931), 75 m depth, silver-containing galena
 Herzog August and Johann Friedcontaining Pit, 1681 - 1931, 430 m depth, silver-containing galena
 Johann Friedcontaining Pit, 1670 - 1681 (1931), 40 m depth, silver-containing galena
 Herzog Georg Wilhelm Pit , 1664 - 1718, probably silver ore
 Landes Herrn Pit 
 Neue Gesellschaft Pit , 1670 - 1745, 135 m depth, probably silver ore
 Neuer Edmund Pit , 1718 - 1755, kein Erzfund
 Neues Zellerfeld Pit , 1703 - 1745, 110 m depth, probably silver-containing galena
 Prinzen Pit , 1691 - 1705, 40 m depth, probably silver ore
 Silberner Bock Pit 
 Silberner Georg Pit , 1692 - 1696, probably silver ore
 Stadt Braunschweig Pit , 1673 - 1686, probably silver ore
 Zellerfelder Hoffnung Pit, 1716 - 1866, 40 m depth, probably silver-containing galena
 Grumbacher Gallery, built 1719 - 1730, length 1.8 km
 Kahlenberg Shaft, 1922 - 1929, prospecting shaft
 1st Lichtloch Shaft
 3rd Lichtloch Shaft
 Drei Bäre Shaft'
 Haus Braunschweig Shaft
 Kahlenbergsglück Shaft
 Neues Lichtloch Shaft

Clausthal-Zellerfeld

Burgstätte Field 
 Caroline Pit
 Dorothea Pit
 Englische Treue Pit
 Kaiser Wilhelm Shaft
 Königin Marien Shaft

Zellerfeld Field 
 Ring and Silberschnur Pit
 Silberne Schreibfeder Pit
 Neuer Johanneser Shaft

Rosenhof Field 
 Rosenhof Pit
 Turmhof Pit
 Ottiliae Shaft
 Silbersegener Shaft

Haus Herzberg Field 
 New Hausherzberg Shaft

Goslar 
  Rammelsberg Ore Mine
 Glockenberg Pit
 Großfürstin Alexandra Pit
 Nordberg Pit
 Ratsschiefer Pit

Lautenthal 
 Lautenthalsglück Pit

Sankt Andreasberg 
 Roter Bär Pit Educational Mine
 Samson Pit
 Wennsglückt Pit

Schulenberg im Harz (Upper and Middle Schulenberg)
including Festenburg im Harz

Bockswiese Field (eastern section), formerly Bockswiese-Schulenberg-Festenburg Field 
 Altenauer Hoffnung Gallery
 Festenburg Gallery, mentioned in 1720
 Gelbe Lilie Pit / Neue Gelbe Lilie Pit , 1669 - 1817, 250 m depth, silver ore, chalcopyrite
 Glücksrad Pit, 1666 - 1824, 250 m depth, silver ore, chalcopyrite
 Gnade Gottes Pit , 1673 - 1769, 270 m depth, probably silver ore, chalcopyrite
 Haus Kronenburg Pit, 1691 - 1705 (1795), 145 m depth, probably silver ore
 Herzog August Wilhelm Pit, 1703 - 1754, 125 m depth, probably silver-containing galena 
 Juliane Sophia Pit, 1776 - 1904, 400 m depth, silver-containing galena
  König Karl Pit, 1711 -1716, probably silver-containing galena
  Kronenburgs Glück Pit, 1705 - 1795, 292 m depth, silver-containing galena
  Kron Festenburg Pit
  Königin Elisabeth Pit, 1713 - 1803, probably silver-containing galena
  Neue Gelbe Lilie Pit , siehe Gelbe Lilie
  Neuer Engel Pit , 1710 - 1736, probably silver-containing galena
  Neues Schulenbergs Glück Pit , see St. Martins Mine
  Prinzen Pit , 1705 - 1737, 190 m depth, probably silver-containing galena
  Schulenbergs Glück Pit , 1690 - 1705 (1795), silver-containing galena
  St. Anna am Schulenberge Pit 
 St. Urban Pit , 1692 - 1814, 253 m depth, silver-containing galena, chalcopyrite
 Unvergängliche Gabe and Reiche Gesellschaft am Schulenberge Pit
 Weißer Schwan Pit, 1691 - 1799, 290 m depth, probably silver-containing galena
 Kleine Mertens Zeche, 1691 - 1738 (1803), probably silver ore
 Caroline Shaft 
  Grüne Tanne Shaft
 Schulenberger Gallery
 St. Martins Mine (Mertens Mine), 1697 -1791, probably silver-containing galena
 Tiefer Schulenberger Gallery, built vor 1600 - 1745, length 2,9 km
 Kaiser Heinreich Mine
 St. Johannes über Kaiser Heincontaining am Schulenberge Mine

Sieber Valley 
 Aurora Pit in the Sieber valley (1900–1922; baryte)

Wildemann 
 Ernst August Pit 
 19 Lachter Gallery and 13 Lachter Gallery

Elbingerode 
 Büchenberg
 Drei Kronen & Ehrt

Straßberg

Straßberg-Neudorfer Field
 Glasebach Pit
 Glücksstern
 Frohe Zukunft
 Getreuer Bergmann (1712-1733)
 Tiefer- or Hütten Gallery
 Richt Shaft
  Glückauf Pit (1712-1744) 
  Kreuz Pit (1747-1758) 
  Maria Anna Pit
 Teufels Pit

Wettelrode 
 Röhrigschacht

Ilfeld 
 Rabenstein Gallery

See also

Mining in the Upper Harz

References 

 01
Mines, Harz